Kaštijelj is a village in the municipalities of Šekovići (Republika Srpska) and Kladanj, Bosnia and Herzegovina.

Demographics 
According to the 2013 census, its population was 128, all Serbs living in the Šekovići part.

References

Populated places in Kladanj
Populated places in Šekovići